The Erland Lee Museum is a National Historic Site of Canada located on the ridge of the Niagara Escarpment in Stoney Creek, Hamilton, Ontario. Originally a farmhouse belonging to Erland and Janet Lee, the museum is recognized as the birthplace of the first Women's Institute, an international organization formed in 1897 to promote the education of isolated rural women.

The oldest part of the home, a log cabin, dates to 1808. An addition was built onto the log cabin in 1873 in the Carpenter Gothic style, part of the Gothic Revival Architectural tradition. This is best exemplified by the steeply-pitched gables, gingerbread trim, and the board-and-batten planks.

The Lee Family lived in the house from 1808 until 1970. Its first historical designation was granted in 1961, by the South Wentworth Women’s Institute. In 1972, the home was opened to the public as a museum, and has since been owned and operated by the Federated Women's Institutes of Ontario. In 1995, the museum was designated as a historic home under the Ontario Heritage Act, and in 2003 the museum was granted status as a National Historic Site of Canada.

The museum closed in December 2010, but reopened 21 April 2013.

The museum itself contains three floors of original Victorian furniture and furnishings, with an emphasis on the history of the Lee family, and the events surrounding the 1897 founding of the Women's Institutes. For example, the dining room table on which Janet Lee wrote the first Women’s Institute constitution still stands in its original location. The farmhouse is complemented by an 1873 carriage house, which contains two floors of local history exhibits.

Images

See also
 Associated Country Women of the World

References

External links
Erland Lee Museum

Museums in Hamilton, Ontario
National Historic Sites in Ontario
Historic house museums in Ontario
Women's museums in Canada
Carpenter Gothic architecture in Canada
Carpenter Gothic houses
Designated heritage properties in Ontario
Wooden houses